Elmhurst may refer to:

Places

Australia
Elmhurst, Victoria

United Kingdom
Elmhurst, Aylesbury
Elmhurst, Staffordshire

United States
Elmhurst, Sacramento, California
Elmhurst, Oakland, California
Elmhurst, Delaware
Elmhurst, Illinois
Elmhurst, Indiana
Elmhurst (Connersville, Indiana), listed on the National Register of Historic Places in Fayette County, Indiana
Elmhurst, Kansas
Elmhurst, Michigan
Elmhurst, Queens, New York
Elmhurst, Chautauqua County, New York
Elmhurst Township, Lackawanna County, Pennsylvania
Elmhurst, Providence, Rhode Island
Elmhurst, Virginia
Elmhurst (Fredericksburg, Virginia), listed on the National Register of Historic Places in Fredericksburg, Virginia
Elmhurst, West Virginia
Elmhurst (Caldwell, West Virginia)
Elmhurst (Wellsburg, West Virginia)
Elmhurst, Wisconsin

West Indies
Elmhurst, a province of the West Indies Federation

Schools

England
Elmhurst Infant School in Aylesbury, Buckinghamshire
Elmhurst Junior School in Aylesbury, Buckinghamshire
Elmhurst School for Boys in Croydon, South London
Elmhurst Ballet School in Birmingham

United States
Elmhurst High School in Fort Wayne, Indiana
Elmhurst University in Elmhurst, Illinois

See also
Elmhirst (disambiguation)